Biomedical Materials is a peer-reviewed medical journal that covers research on tissue engineering and regenerative medicine. The editors-in-chief are Myron Spector (Harvard Medical School and VA Boston Healthcare System) and Joyce Wong (Boston University).

Abstracting and indexing 
The journal is abstracted and indexed in:

According to the Journal Citation Reports, the journal has a 2020 impact factor of 3.715.

References

External links 
 

IOP Publishing academic journals
Bimonthly journals
Publications established in 2006
English-language journals
Materials science journals